The 1998–99 George Washington Colonials men's basketball team represent George Washington University as a member of the Atlantic 10 Conference during the 1998–99 NCAA Division I men's basketball season. The team was coached by Tom Penders and played their home games at the Charles E. Smith Athletic Center. The Colonials finished atop the regular season conference standings. After being knocked out in the semifinal round of the A-10 tournament, GW received an at-large bid to the 1998 NCAA tournament as No. 11 seed in the South region. The Colonials were defeated by No. 6 seed Indiana, 108–88, to finish with a record of 20–9 (13–3 A-10).

Roster

Schedule and results

|-
!colspan=9 style=| Regular season

|-
!colspan=9 style=| Atlantic 10 Tournament

|-
!colspan=9 style=| NCAA Tournament

Rankings

References

George Washington
George Washington Colonials men's basketball seasons
George Washington